Laleh Bagh (also Romanized as Lāleh Bāgh) is a village in Fenderesk-e Shomali Rural District, Fenderesk District, Ramian County, Golestan Province, Iran. At the 2006 census, its population was 942, in 230 families.

References 

Populated places in Ramian County